John Cushing Aylwin (1780s – January 28, 1813) was an officer in the United States Navy during the War of 1812.

Early life 
Born in Quebec, Canada, Aylwin worked on board British naval vessels at an early age. Though never formally enrolled in the Royal Navy, he received increasing responsibilities eventually performing the duties of a mate by 1795. He refused the offer of a midshipman's warrant, but continued service at sea—apparently against his will—for another six years. Ill health, however, finally brought about his return home.

Later career 
Then, for several years, he commanded merchant ships out of Boston, Massachusetts. When war between the United States and Great Britain broke out in 1812, Aylwin received an appointment as a lieutenant in the United States Navy and became sailing master in Constitution. He received commendations for his gallantry during that frigate's engagement with Guerriere on 19 August 1812. In which he refused medical attention until everyone else on the ship had received it.

Lt. Aylwin took part in the battle between Constitution and HMS Java on 29 December 1812. Severely wounded during that encounter, Aylwin later died at sea.

Namesakes
Four ships in the United States Navy have been named USS Aylwin for him.

References

1778 births
1813 deaths
American military personnel killed in the War of 1812
People who died at sea
Pre-Confederation Quebec people
United States Navy officers
United States Navy personnel of the War of 1812